The Soviet RG-41 was a fragmentation grenade developed during World War II. It was in production for only short time from 1941 to 1942 before being replaced by RG-42.

It contained a 150 g high explosive charge in a cylindrical can; the total weight was about 440 grams. The grenade could be thrown about 30 to 50 meters; the lethal radius was up to 5 meters; the maximum lethal radius was up to 15 meters.

See also 
 RG-42
 RGD-33
 List of Russian weaponry

References

External links 
 Finnish Junkyard

Hand grenades of the Soviet Union
World War II infantry weapons of the Soviet Union
Anti-tank grenades
Weapons and ammunition introduced in 1941